59 Times the Pain was a Swedish hardcore punk band. They were active from 1992 until 2001. 

The band was formed in Fagersta, Sweden in 1992 by Magnus Larnhed (Vocals / guitar), Michael Conradsson (bass), Toni Virtanen (drums) and Kai Kalliomäki (guitar). Their band name is taken from a Hüsker Dü song. Kalliomäki soon left the band to be replaced by Niklas Lundgren, who left hardcore band "Dislars" later to become the more known Burst. Their first demo "Feeling Down" got some attention from Burning Heart Records, and in 1993, the band signed to the label. The following year the band recorded their debut album Blind Anger & Hate.

In March 1995, 59 Times the Pain started recording their second full-length album, More Out of Today at Unisound. The underground success of More Out of Today and the debut single "Blind Anger & Hate" allowed 59 Times the Pain to establish themselves as a successful band. They did this through extensive touring, with their shows gaining excellent reviews.

Their fourth album, End of the Millennium, was released in March 1999 with their fifth (and final) album, Calling The Public, released in 2001. The band also had songs included on several compilations, including 1999's Short Music for Short People and Punk-O-Rama Vol. 4. The band split in 2001. On January 30, 2008 they announced that they were reforming to play Groezrock festival.

Discography

Full-length albums
Blind Anger & Hate - 1994
More Out of Today - 1995
Twenty Percent of My Hand - 1997
End of the Millennium - 1999
Calling the Public - 2001

EPs
Even More Out Of Today - 1995
Music For Hardcorepunx - 1998
Turn At 25th - 1999
59 Times the Pain / Subterranean Kids (1999, split, Tralla Records)

Music Videos
 More Out of Today (1995)
 Can't Change Me (1997)
 Turn at 25th (1999)

Compilations
Punk+ - 1995
Cheap Shots vol.1 - 1995
Cheap Shots vol.2 - 1996
Cheap Shots vol.3 - 1997
Punk-O-Rama Vol. 4 - 1999
Short Music for Short People - 1999
Cheap Shots vol.4 - 2000
Cheap Shots vol.5 - 2001
Hang The VJ (video) - 2001
Hardcore for Syria - 2012

Band members
Magnus Larnhed - Vocals / Guitar
Niklas Lundgren - Guitar
Toni Virtanen - Drums
Michael Conradsson - Bass

Past members
Kai Kalliomäki (guitar)

External links
59 Times The Pain at "Discogs" webpage
59 Times The Pain at "Allmusic.com" webpage

Swedish hardcore punk groups
Musical groups established in 1992
Musical groups disestablished in 2001
Musical quartets
Burning Heart Records artists